"I Surrender Dear" is a 1931 jazz song.

I Surrender Dear may also refer to:

 I Surrender Dear (1931 film), a 1931 film directed by Mack Sennett and starring Bing Crosby
 I Surrender Dear (1948 film), a 1948 film directed by Arthur Dreifuss and starring Gloria Jean

See also
 I Surrender (disambiguation)